William Thomas Murray (9 April 1890 – 23 October 1980) was an Australian politician.

He was born at Lilyfield to power station engineer Michael Murray and Mary Ryan. He was educated by the Marist Brothers and at Fort Street High School, becoming a railway officer. A Labor Party member from 1922, he was involved in the Railway and Tramway Officers' Association, which became the Australasian Transport Officers' Association. On 7 October 1924 he married May Boyle, with whom he had three daughters. An executive member of the Transport Officers' Association, he was a Marrickville alderman from 1941 to 1959, serving as mayor in 1945, 1946 and 1954. From 1956 to 1969 he served on Sydney County Council, including as chairman from 1959 to 1960. From 1952 to 1976 he was a Labor member of the New South Wales Legislative Council. Murray died in Marrickville in 1980.

References

 

1890 births
1980 deaths
Australian Labor Party members of the Parliament of New South Wales
Members of the New South Wales Legislative Council
20th-century Australian politicians
Mayors of Marrickville
Councillors of Sydney County Council